1010 Common (formerly the Bank of New Orleans Building), located at 1010 Common Street in the Central Business District of New Orleans, Louisiana, is a 31-story skyscraper.  The building, designed by Skidmore, Owings & Merrill and completed in 1970, is an example of the international style typical of the time.  It is located adjacent to the 14-story Latter Center Garage & Annex.

It was listed on the National Register of Historic Places in 2016.

See also
 List of tallest buildings in New Orleans
 National Register of Historic Places listings in Orleans Parish, Louisiana

References

External links

 1010 Common on Emporis.com
 1010 Common on Regis Property

Skyscraper office buildings in New Orleans
Skidmore, Owings & Merrill buildings
Office buildings completed in 1970
National Register of Historic Places in New Orleans
1970 establishments in Louisiana